Puckman may refer to:

Pac-Man, whose original Japanese name was PUCKMAN
RPI Engineers men's ice hockey mascot, Puckman